Pink Lake is an outer western suburb of Esperance, a town in south-eastern Western Australia. It is named for Pink Lake, a pink-blue lake located within its boundaries.

References

Suburbs of Esperance, Western Australia